Moira Coatsworth (born 1953 or 1954) is a former president of the New Zealand Labour Party, serving in that role from 2011 to 2015.

Early years
Born in South Africa, Coatsworth moved to New Zealand when she was eight. She works as a child psychologist and owns a small farm in the Coromandel.

Political career
Coatsworth joined the Labour Party in the 1980s during anti-mining campaigns in the Coromandel. Later, she was the Waikato-Bay of Plenty regional representative in Labour's New Zealand Council.

Before being elected president, Coatsworth was Senior Vice President of the Labour Party. She was elected President of the Labour Party unopposed on 2 April 2011.

She has "absolutely no ambition" to be an MP.

Resignation
On 26 November 2014, Coatsworth announced her intention to move forward her resignation as president to mid-December 2014, after completing the election in which Andrew Little was elected Party Leader, and starting the party's 2014 review. She stated that her reasons for leaving were that she wants "to see a new president working with Andrew as the new leader, really hitting the ground running at the beginning of next year and getting a plan in and getting moving." Nigel Haworth was elected as her successor.

References

Living people
New Zealand Labour Party politicians
21st-century New Zealand women politicians
Year of birth missing (living people)
Place of birth missing (living people)
1950s births
South African emigrants to New Zealand